...Felt Like Making a Live Record is a live album released by singer-songwriter Josh Clayton-Felt.

Overview
The album was recorded during a tour in support of the Josh Clayton-Felt's debut solo album Inarticulate Nature Boy. The album also features covers and a previously unreleased song.

Track listing
All songs by Josh Clayton-Felt except where noted. 

1997 live albums
Josh Clayton-Felt albums